Harmonia antipodum, known as the antipodean ladybird, is a species of ladybird beetle (family Coccinellidae)  indigenous to New Zealand, though sometimes mistaken for a related non-native species, Harmonia conformis. They are a brown colour, and about 3 mm long, while H. conformis is much larger and more conspicuously coloured.

References

External links

Coccinellidae
Beetles of New Zealand
Beetles described in 1848